Francisco Hervás may refer to:

 Francisco Hervás (volleyball)
 Francisco Hervás (swimmer)